Motel is an Australian television soap opera produced by the Seven Network's ATN-7 studios from 1968 to 1969 It was created by Richard Lane

Synopsis 
 
Motel, like British serial Crossroads dealt with a family who ran a motel. In this case the Gillian family running the fictional Greenfields Motel.

Production 
 
The series had a cast of thirteen regulars and required three days in the studio each week. Each episode was thirty minutes and the program screened at midday four days a week, with the episode repeated late at night. The show was shot in black-and-white. It had a run of 135 episodes. Writers included Creswick Jenkinson.

Selected cast 

 Tony Bazell - Mark Jefferies
 Ross Higgins - Reverend Larcombe
 Jill Forster - Gaye Gillian
 Brian James - Paul Drennan
 Enid Lorimer - Bunty Creighton
 Gregory Ross - Chris Gillian
 Jack Thompson - Bill Burke
 Noel Trevarthen - Rod Gillian

Reception
 
According to creator Richard Lane, who also worked on the series as a writer, the series was very successful as a day time program, which was how it was conceived. But when Channel Seven management "became over enthusiastic and repeated it at nighttime it was a disaster."

Notes

External links
Motel at the National Film and Sound Archive
 
 Clip from Show at YouTube

Seven Network original programming
Australian television soap operas
1968 Australian television series debuts
1968 Australian television series endings
Black-and-white Australian television shows
English-language television shows